Flora MacDonald (Gaelic: Fionnghal nic Dhòmhnaill, 1722 - 5 March 1790) was a member of Clan Macdonald of Sleat, best known for helping Charles Edward Stuart evade government troops after the Battle of Culloden in April 1746. Her family generally backed the government during the 1745 Rising and MacDonald later claimed to have assisted Charles out of sympathy for his situation.

Arrested and held in the Tower of London, she was released under a general amnesty in June 1747. She later married Allan MacDonald and the couple emigrated to North Carolina in 1773. Their support for the British government during the American War of Independence meant the loss of their American estates and they returned to Scotland, where she died in 1790.

Early life 

Flora MacDonald was born in 1722 at Milton on the island of South Uist in the Outer Hebrides, third and last child of Ranald MacDonald (d. 1723) and his second wife, Marion. Her father was a member of the minor gentry of Clan MacDonald of Clanranald, being tacksman and leaseholder of Milton and Balivanich.  She had two brothers, Angus, who later inherited the Milton tack, and Ronald, who died young. 

Whilst some parts of the MacDonald clan remained Catholic, particularly in the Hebrides, Flora's family was part of South Uist's Protestant minority. Through her father's younger brother, Maighstir Alasdair MacDhòmhnaill, the Non-Juring Episcopalian Rector of Kilchoan and a Clanranald tacksman based in Moidart, she was first cousin to the Jacobite war poet Alasdair mac Mhaighstir Alasdair, who along with Sorley MacLean is considered one of the two most important figures in Scottish Gaelic literature.

Her father died soon after her birth and in 1728 her widowed mother married Hugh MacDonald, Tacksman of Armadale, on the Isle of Skye, for Clan Macdonald of Sleat. Meanwhile, Flora MacDonald was brought up by her father's cousin, Sir Alexander MacDonald, Chief of Clan Macdonald of Sleat. Suggestions she was educated in Edinburgh cannot be confirmed.

The escape of Prince Charles Edward Stuart

MacDonald was visiting Benbecula in the Outer Hebrides when Prince Charles and a small group of aides took refuge there after the Battle of Culloden in June 1746. One of his companions, Captain Conn O'Neill from County Antrim, was distantly related to MacDonald and asked for her help. MacDonald of Sleat had not joined the Rebellion and Benbecula was controlled by a pro-government militia commanded by MacDonald's step-father, Hugh MacDonald. This connection allowed her to obtain the necessary permits but she apparently hesitated, fearing the consequences for her family if they were caught. She may have been taking less of a risk than it appears; witnesses later claimed Hugh advised the Prince where to hide from his search parties.

Passes were issued allowing passage to the mainland for MacDonald, a boat's crew of six men and two personal servants, including Charles disguised as an Irish maid called Betty Burke. On 27 June, they landed near Sir Alexander's house at Monkstadt, near Kilbride, Skye. In his absence, his wife Lady Margaret arranged lodging with her steward, MacDonald of Kingsburgh, who told Charles to remove his disguise, as it simply made him more conspicuous. The next day, Charles was taken from Portree to the island of Raasay; MacDonald remained on Skye and they never met again.

Two weeks later, the boatmen were detained and confessed; MacDonald and Kingsburgh were arrested and taken to the Tower of London. After Lady Margaret interceded on her behalf with the chief Scottish legal officer, Duncan Forbes of Culloden, she was allowed to live outside the Tower under the supervision of a "King's Messenger" and released after the June 1747 Act of Indemnity. Aristocratic sympathisers collected over £1,500 for her, one of the contributors being Frederick, Prince of Wales, heir to the throne; she allegedly told him she helped Charles out of charity and would have done the same for him.
 
On 6 November 1750, at the age of 28, she married Allan MacDonald, a captain in the British Army and Kingsburgh's eldest son. The couple first lived at Flodigarry on Skye and inherited the family estate in 1772 after Kingsburgh died. The writer and Jacobite sympathiser Samuel Johnson met her in 1773 during his visit to the island, and later described her as "a woman of soft features, gentle manners, kind soul and elegant presence". He was also author of the inscription on her memorial at Kilmuir: "a name that will be mentioned in history, and if courage and fidelity be virtues, mentioned with honour".

Emigration to North Carolina

During the 1756–1763 Seven Years' War, Allan MacDonald had served with some distinction in the 114th and 62nd Regiments of Foot but proved to be a poor businessman. After quarrelling with his landlord over debts and rent, he and Flora emigrated in 1774 to Anson County, North Carolina, and settled on a plantation they named "Killegray". When the American Revolutionary War began in 1775, Allan raised the Anson Battalion of the Loyalist North Carolina Militia, a total of around 1,000 men, including their sons Alexander and James.

Tradition records that as the Anson battalion assembled in Cross Creek on 15 February 1776, Flora "addressed them in their own Gaelic tongue and excited them to the highest pitch of warlike enthusiasm", a tradition known among the Scottish clans as a "brosnachadh-catha" or "incitement to battle." They then set off for the coast to link up with some 2,000 British reinforcements commanded by General Henry Clinton, who in reality had only just sailed from Cork in Ireland. Early on the morning of 17 February, they were ambushed at Moore's Creek Bridge by Patriot militia led by Richard Caswell and along with his troops, Allan MacDonald was taken prisoner. 

After the battle, Flora was interrogated by North Carolina's Committee of Safety, before which she exhibited "spirited behaviour." In April 1777, all Loyalist-owned property was confiscated by the North Carolina Provincial Congress and Flora was evicted from Killegray, with the loss of all her possessions. After 18 months in captivity, Allan was released as part of a prisoner exchange in September 1777 and posted to Fort Edward, Nova Scotia as commander of the 84th Regiment of Foot. Here he was joined by Flora in August 1778.

Return to Skye 
 

After a harsh winter in Halifax, Nova Scotia, in September 1779 MacDonald took passage for London in the Dunmore, a British privateer; during the voyage, she broke her arm and ill-health delayed her return to Scotland until spring 1780. She spent the next few years living with various family members, including Dunvegan, home of her son-in-law Major General Alexander MacLeod, the largest landowner in Skye after the MacDonalds. The compensation received for the loss of their property in North Carolina was insufficient to allow them to resettle in Nova Scotia and Allan returned to Scotland in 1784. Kingsburgh was now occupied by Flora's half-sister and her husband, and Allan instead took up farming in nearby Penduin.

According to historian J.P. MacLean, in later life Flora often said that she first served the House of Stuart and then the House of Hanover and was worsted in the cause of each. She died in 1790 at the age of 68 and was buried in Kilmuir Cemetery, followed by her husband in September 1792. They had seven surviving children, two daughters and five sons, two of whom were lost at sea in 1781 and 1782; a third son John made his fortune in India, enabling his parents to spend their last years in some comfort.

Legacy 

Traditional portrayals of the escape focus on Charles, MacDonald being relegated to a secondary role and receiving less credit than is her due. She rarely spoke of the episode and her last contact with Charles was when they parted ways at Portree; it appears at least one motive was that his presence endangered her family.

The Victorians created a Scottish cultural identity expressed through tartans, the late 19th-century inventions of Burns Suppers and Highland Games, and the co-option of romantic icons like Mary, Queen of Scots and Bonnie Prince Charlie. In 1878, MacDonald took her place in this pantheon with the publication of an alleged "Autobiography"; ghost-written by her granddaughter Flora Frances Wylde, it contains so many mistakes that it could not have been written by her. Many of these errors were repeated by Charles Ewald in his 1886 book The Life and Times of Prince Charles Edward which remains the basis for many popular perspectives on her life and motivations.

In 1884, Sir Harold Boulton wrote an adaptation of an existing melody which he named "The Skye Boat Song". This was soon followed by the first performance of the Scottish highland dance "Flora MacDonald's Fancy", while a bronze statue was erected at Inverness Castle in 1896, with her dog Flossie by her side. The Flora MacDonald Academy, formerly Flora Macdonald College, in Red Springs, North Carolina is named after her and two of her children are interred on the campus; until 2009, it was also the site of the Flora Macdonald Highland Games.

MacDonald was painted several times by Scottish portrait artist Allan Ramsay (1713–1784), most of which have now survived. The one used in this article was done after her release from the Tower in 1749–1750; in 2015, a previously unrecorded painting, allegedly also by Ramsay, was discovered in Florida.

In popular culture
 In the 1948 film Bonnie Prince Charlie, Flora MacDonald is portrayed by Margaret Leighton, with David Niven as Prince Charles. Niven later recalled the film as "...one of those huge, florid extravaganzas that reek of disaster from the start."
 Inglis Fletcher, The Scotswoman (1954); a novel based on Flora MacDonald's life in North Carolina during the American War of Independence.
 The Flask, a Dutch folkband, released the song Flora MacDonald in 2021, telling her story from saving Prince Charlie until her death.

References

Sources 
 
 Douglas, Hugh; Flora MacDonald: The Most Loyal Rebel (Sutton Publishing, 1999); 
 
 Fraser, Flora; Pretty Young Rebel: The Life of Flora Macdonald (Bloomsbury, 2022);

External links
 
 

1722 births
1790 deaths
Scottish Jacobites
People from Uist
Loyalists in the American Revolution from North Carolina
Women in 18th-century warfare
Prisoners in the Tower of London
Women in European warfare
Women in the American Revolution
Women in Scotland
Scottish-American culture in North Carolina
Scottish Presbyterians
Protestant Jacobites
18th-century Scottish people
18th-century Scottish women